Shahrak-e Makuyeh (also Romanized as Shahrak-e Makūyeh; also known as Makūyeh) is a village in Seyfabad Rural District, in the Central District of Khonj County, Fars Province, Iran. At the 2006 census, its population was 854, in 165 families.

References 

Populated places in Khonj County